The TNC connector (acronym of "Threaded Neill–Concelman") is a threaded version of the BNC connector.

Description
The interface specifications for the TNC and many other connectors are referenced in MIL-STD-348. The connector has a 50 Ω impedance and operates best in the 0–11 GHz frequency spectrum. It has better performance than the BNC connector at microwave frequencies. Invented in the late 1950s and named after Paul Neill of Bell Labs and Carl Concelman of Amphenol, the TNC connector has been employed in a wide range of radio and wired applications. 

The TNC connector features a 7/16"-28 thread, not to be confused with a 7/16 DIN connector, which is the diameter of the mating surfaces as specified in millimeters.

Variations

Reverse-polarity TNC 

Reverse-polarity TNC (RP-TNC, sometimes RTNC) is a variation of the TNC specification which reverses the polarity of the interface. This is usually achieved by incorporating the female contacts normally found in jacks into the plug, and the male contacts normally found in plugs into the jack.

Because they were not readily available, RP-TNC connectors have been widely used by Wi-Fi equipment manufacturers to comply with specific local regulations, such as those from the FCC, which are designed to prevent consumers from connecting antennas which exhibit gain and therefore breach compliance.  The FCC considered that the RP-TNC was acceptable in preventing consumers changing the antenna; but by 2000 it regarded them as readily available, though delaying its ruling indefinitely.  As of 2013, leading manufacturers are still using RP-TNC connectors on their Wi-Fi equipment.
Plug on the female connector and receptacle on the male when dealing with RP-TNC.

TNCA 
The TNCA connector is a variant of the TNC connector specified in MIL-STD-348 designed to provide an air gap in the dielectric region between the male and female connectors. The socket version of the TNCA connector is nearly identically to the standard TNC connector, while the pin contact version provides the air cavity differentiating it from a standard TNC connector, as such TNCA connectors are mechanically compatible and matable with standard conjugate TNC connectors.

75 ohm TNC
Most TNC connectors are 50-ohm type even when used with coaxial cable of other impedances, but a 75-ohm series is also available, providing a good SWR to about 1 GHz. These can be recognized by a reduced amount of dielectric in the mating ends.  They are intermatable with standard types.

See also
RF connector
SMA connector
SMB connector
SMC connector
N connector
Optical fiber connector

References 

TNC

de:Koaxiale Steckverbinder für Hochfrequenzanwendungen#TNC-Steckverbinder
ru:Коаксиальный радиочастотный разъём#TNC-коннектор